Ouaoumana is a commune in Khénifra Province of the Béni Mellal-Khénifra administrative region of Morocco. At the time of the 2004 census, the commune had a total population of 7846 people living in 1647 households.

References

Populated places in Khénifra Province
Rural communes of Béni Mellal-Khénifra